Sun Qinhan (born 21 March 2000) is a Chinese footballer currently playing as a midfielder for Changchun Yatai, on loan from Shanghai Shenhua.

Career statistics

Club
.

References

2000 births
Living people
Chinese footballers
China youth international footballers
Association football midfielders
China League One players
Chinese Super League players
Shanghai Shenhua F.C. players
Beijing Sport University F.C. players
Changchun Yatai F.C. players